CSS Raleigh may refer to:

  was a gunboat that served as a tender to CSS Virginia during the Battle of Hampton Roads
  was an ironclad ram which patrolled the Cape Fear River near Wilmington, North Carolina

See also